William I. Hitchcock is the William W. Corcoran Professor of History at the University of Virginia. His work focuses on the history of the 20th century.

Books 
 France Restored: Cold War Diplomacy and the Quest for Stability in Europe, 1945-1954, Chapel Hill, NC: University of North Carolina Press, 1998. , 
 From War to Peace: Altered Strategic Landscapes in the Twentieth Century. Co-edited with Paul Kennedy, New Haven: Yale University Press, 2000. , 
 The Struggle for Europe: The Turbulent History of a Divided Continent, 1945-present New York: Doubleday, 2003; London, Profile Books, 2003 , ; Anchor Books paperback, 2004).
 The Bitter Road to Freedom: A New History of the Liberation of Europe. New York: The Free Press/Simon and Schuster, 2008. , ; Published simultaneously in Britain by Faber and Co., London. 2009 Pulitzer Prize finalist in General Nonfiction.
 The Human Rights Revolution: An International History, co-edited with Akira Iriye and Petra Goedde. New York: Oxford University Press, 2012. , 
 The Age of Eisenhower: America and the World in the 1950s. New York: Simon & Schuster, 2018. ,

References

Further reading
 "H-Diplo Roundtable XX-24 on William Hitchcock. The Age of Eisenhower: America and the World in the 1950s " (H-DIPLO 11 February 2019) online

External links 

Living people
21st-century American historians
21st-century American male writers
Historians of the United States
Kenyon College alumni
Yale University alumni
University of Virginia faculty
Year of birth missing (living people)
American male non-fiction writers